Sphingosyl phosphatide refers to a lipid containing phosphorus and a long-chain base.

References
Cyberlipid Center – sphingosylphosphatides

Phospholipids